Neorapana is a genus of large predatory tropical sea snails, marine gastropod mollusks in the family Muricidae, the rock snails.

Species
Species within the genus Neorapana include:
 Neorapana grandis Sowerby I, 1835
 Neorapana muricata (Broderip, 1832) 
 Neorapana tuberculata (Sowerby I, 1835)

References

 
Taxonomy articles created by Polbot